Stephanie M. Carlson is the A.S. Leopold Chair in Wildlife Biology at the University of California Berkeley. Her research considers fish ecology, freshwater ecology, and evolutionary ecology.

Education 
Carlson was the first member of her family to attend college. She earned her undergraduate degree in evolution and ecology at the University of California, Davis. She moved across the United States for her graduate studies, joining the Department of Organismic and Evolutionary Biology at the University of Massachusetts  for a master's degree. After completing her master's degree in 2002, Carlson joined the University of Washington School for Aquatic and Fisheries Science as a doctoral researcher.

Research 
Carson studies how predator-prey relationships and anthropogenic influences inform the ecology and evolution of freshwater fish populations. After graduating, Carlson was awarded a Marie Curie Early Stage Training Fellowship to join the University of Oslo Centre for Ecological and Evolutionary Synthesis. In 2007 Carlson was awarded appointed an NSF Postdoctoral Fellow in Biological Informatics at the University of California, Santa Cruz.

She started her independent scientific career at the University of California, Berkeley. Here she has specialised on evolution and loss of biodiversity among salmon populations, impacts of drought and climate change on streams, the ecological and evolutionary impacts of management (water, fishery, hatchery, and protected areas), harvest selection and evolutionary enlightened management. Her research identified that the loss of diversity amongst salmon in managed rivers reduces their ability to respond to climate change. Salmon are usually protected form changing environmental conditions by the portfolio effect; which describes the diversity of salmon migration strategies.

Awards and honours 

 2005 J. Frances Allen Scholarship, American Fisheries Society
 2010 Jasper Loftus-Hills Young Investigator Award, American Society of Naturalists
 2013 Young Faculty Award 
 2014 Rose Hills Innovator Award 
 2016 A.S. Leopold Chair in Wildlife Biology

Select publications

Personal life 
Carlson is part of the organisation 500 Queer Scientists.

References

External links 

 Lab Website
 

21st-century American biologists
Women herpetologists
Women evolutionary biologists
Living people
American herpetologists
University of California, Berkeley College of Natural Resources faculty
University of California, Davis alumni
Year of birth missing (living people)
21st-century American women scientists